Jack Hargreaves OBE (31 December 1911 – 15 March 1994) was an English television presenter and writer whose enduring interest was to comment without nostalgia or sentimentality on accelerating distortions in relations between the city and the countryside, seeking – in entertaining ways – to question and rebut metropolitan assumptions about its character and function.

He is remembered for appearing on How, a children's programme, which he also conceived, about how things worked or ought to work. It ran from 1966 on Southern Television and networked on ITV until the demise of Southern in 1981.

Hargreaves was the presenter of the weekly magazine programme Out of Town, first broadcast in 1960 following the success of his series Gone Fishing the previous year. Broadcast on Friday evenings on Southern Television the programme was also taken up by many of the other ITV regions, usually in a Sunday afternoon slot. In 1967, with Ollie Kite he presented Country Boy, a networked children's programme of 20 episodes in which a boy from the city was introduced to the ways of country. Two further series followed in 1969 and 1970. Other programmes he created for local viewers were Farm Progress and a live afternoon series Houseparty. His country TV programmes continued after the demise of Southern with Old Country for Channel 4.

He was involved in the setting up of ITV, and a member of Southern's board of directors, and was employed by the National Farmers' Union, serving on the Nugent Committee (the Defence Lands Committee that investigated which parts of the Ministry of Defence holdings could be returned to private ownership). Hargreaves was appointed Officer of the Order of the British Empire (OBE) in the 1972 New Year Honours. 

A biography of Hargreaves by Paul Peacock was published in July 2006.

Early career
Born in London in 1911 to James and Ada Hargreaves (née Jubb), Jack (christened John Herbert) was one of three brothers. The family was rooted in Huddersfield in the West Riding of Yorkshire, but James Hargreaves based himself partly in London for commercial advantage and to allow his wife the benefit of the capital's midwifery. The brothers attended Merchant Taylors' School, Northwood near London after which Edward and Ronald Hargreaves pursued successful careers in medicine (Ronald became a noted psychiatrist), while Jack went to study at the Royal Veterinary College at London University in 1929. On leaving university he earned a living as a copywriter, journalist and script writer for radio and films, and by the late 1930s he had established a reputation for his pioneering approaches to radio broadcasting.

At the outset of the Second World War, broadcasting was recognised as part of the war effort. Hargreaves' talents in this field meant that he faced being recruited to a restricted post in radio, a reserved occupation. Instead, he joined the Royal Artillery as a gunner, quickly became an NCO, entered the Royal Military College, Sandhurst, and was commissioned into the Royal Tank Regiment. Even so, Hargreaves' reputation as a communicator went ahead of him. He was recruited to the staff of General Montgomery to play a role setting up broadcasting services to allied forces before and after D-Day. He left the army in 1945 with the substantive rank of major, having briefly held the acting rank of lieutenant-colonel.

After the war, Hargreaves continued his media career and during the 1950s was editor of Lilliput magazine and Picture Post where he commissioned work from Bert Hardy. His brilliance as a communications manager led to his being recruited to the National Farmers Union by Jim Turner, later Lord Netherthorpe, who was celebrated for his success as a lobbyist for farmers. Working closely with Turner, Hargreaves organised and developed the NFU's Information Department, founding the British Farmer magazine during an almost intractable crisis of trust between NFU HQ and the members of the largest union in the country, many of whom were experiencing seismic change in the agricultural economy. 

Hargreaves loved angling. Bemused at the way it had, from "sociological, technical, financial and Malthusian" causes become tribalised by class and species, he wrote Fishing for a Year (1951), arguing "for regression" – the pursuit of different fish, in separate places and varied methods throughout the licensed seasons. "What do they know of fishing" he wrote "who know only one fish and one way to fish for him?" Yet his language was seldom so polemic and never adversarial. Hargreaves' style was complemented in this first book by the drawings of his friend Bernard Venables:

"It is one of the most excellent provisions of Nature" he wrote in a chapter for the warmest time of the year "that chub are to be angled for on hot summer afternoons ... When the grass is high and full of hum and rustle, when the comfrey blooms along the edge of the water and the air shivers in the heat, the chub lie just under the surface in slacks and corners and eddies all along the bank. You will see them and you will think they have not seen you". His writing and contacts among anglers saw the president of the Piscatorial Society, Sir Robert Saundby, asking Hargreaves to organise the Society's library. With typical thoroughness the collection was removed to Jack's home, leaving it fully catalogued with not a volume unread. This was when he became sceptical about the opinion of the 17th-century author of The Compleat Angler, Izaak Walton, as to the culinary qualities of the chub – a dish Hargreaves described as "eating cotton wool full of pins and needles".

The Nugent Report
As an independent member of the Defence Lands Committee 1971–73, Hargreaves made key contributions to the Nugent Report, 1973, reviewing the use of land held by the country's armed forces for defence purposes. He became of the opinion that one of the best ways to reserve the countryside for its proper purpose was to keep most people out of it. He believed that although agriculture would be preferable, military exercises seemed less harmful in their impact on the environment than its use for the recreational choices of a predominantly urban population. This was a conundrum he shared wryly with his audience, gently repeating the point, that the countryside, insofar as it had a purpose for humans, was to grow their food in sustainable ways.

Family

Jack Hargreaves was married, in 1932, to Jeanette Haighler. They had two sons, Mark and Victor; then, after divorce, he married Elisabeth Van de Putte. Two more sons were born – James Stephen in 1946 and Edward John in 1947. That marriage ended in 1948 when he began a relationship with a journalist from Vogue, Barbara Baddeley.

Living with her until 1963, Hargreaves became a stepfather to Bay and her brother Simon, Barbara's children by the diplomat John Baddeley. He also had a daughter Polly, born in 1957 as a result of a six-year relationship with his secretary Judy Hogg.

In 1965, Hargreaves married Isobel Hatfield (born 12 April 1919).  Isobel died four years after her husband on 5 February 1998 and her ashes were scattered with his on Bulbarrow Hill in Dorset, near their home.

Published film, tapes and DVDs
Hargreaves had worked with Steve Wade on How before Southern Television lost its franchise. In 1985 Hargreaves worked with Wade to make 27 new Out of Town episodes for video release. Instead of the studio 'shed' that had been a mainstay of the earlier series, these episodes were made in Hargreaves's real shed at his last home – Raven Cottage, Belchalwell, Dorset.

Using original cut film inserts he had bought from Southern, Hargreaves acquired a  Steenbeck editing machine and, with Wade, selected films to be inserted into the new series with new links shot in the shed. They were distributed by Primetime, later Endemol, as VHS tapes and later DVDs.

Hargreaves also authored a number of audio-tapes and long play records on his favourite subjects.

In 2004, a full-length edition of Out of Town, first broadcast on 23 May 1980, was included on a DVD released by ITV Meridian to mark the closing of Southern Television's Southampton studios. Until 2012 this remained the only one of Hargreaves' original broadcast programmes to have been published in any format. The whereabouts of the remaining master tapes was unknown for many years but 34 complete original episodes of Out of Town – broadcast in 1980 and 1981 – eventually came to light, and were made available on DVD.

Hargreaves' stepson, Simon Baddeley, who had been bequeathed rights in his stepfather's books, film and sound footage, purchased Out of Town DVD rights from Endemol, restoring and re-releasing many more broadcasts via his licensee, Network on Air.

References

Bibliography
Jack Hargreaves, illustrated by Bernard Venables, Fishing for a year MacGibbon & Kee 1951, republished Medlar Press 1998
Jack Hargreaves and others, HOW Annual, Independent Television Books 1975
Jack Hargreaves, Out of Town: A Life Relived on Television, Dovecote Press 1987
Jack Hargreaves, The Old Country,  Dovecote Press 1988
Jack Hargreaves with Terry Heathcote, The New Forest: A Portrait in Colour, Dovecote Press 1992
Paul Peacock, Jack Hargreaves – A Portrait, Farming Books & Videos 2006
Report of the Defence Lands Committee 1971–73. Chairman: The Rt Hon The Lord Nugent of Guildford. Cmnd.5714. London:HMSO 1973
Colin Willock, The Gun Punt Adventure, new edition, Tideline Books 1988

External links

Laurence Marcus' illustrated and referenced site about 'Out of Town'
Jack Hargreaves' last broadcast for the 'Out of Town' series in 1981
Fishing for Black Bream with an 'exploding' bait box – a recently edited copy of a 1970s episode of 'Out of Town'
A specially made episode of 'Out of Town', along with a 'How!' reunion compered by Fred Dinenage, broadcast the evening Jack Hargreaves died

1911 births
1994 deaths
British Army personnel of World War II
English non-fiction writers
English television presenters
Graduates of the Royal Military College, Sandhurst
People educated at Merchant Taylors' School, Northwood
People from Palmers Green
People from Aylesbury
Royal Tank Regiment officers
English male non-fiction writers
Royal Artillery soldiers
20th-century English male writers
Officers of the Order of the British Empire